Trøftskogen Chapel is a parish church of the Church of Norway in Nord-Odal Municipality in Innlandet county, Norway. It is located in the village of Trautskogen. It is one of the two churches for the Sand parish which is part of the Solør, Vinger og Odal prosti (deanery) in the Diocese of Hamar. The white, wooden chapel was built in a long church design in 1931 using plans drawn up by the State building inspector's office. The chapel seats about 80 people.

History
At first, there was a desire to have a separate hall at the local school for church use, but this never happened. Instead, fundraising and planning eventually led to the construction of a separate chapel at Trøftskogen (later named Trautskogen). In 1928, architectural drawings were received from the State building inspector's office which were used for the new chapel. The local parishioners contributed materials and volunteer work to construct the building. It is a log building with a long church design. There is a sacristy on both sides of the choir. The new chapel was consecrated by the bishop on 11 October 1931. In 1952, the building was wired for electricity. It wasn't until 2009 that the chapel received smoke alarms.

See also
List of churches in Hamar

References

Nord-Odal
Churches in Innlandet
Long churches in Norway
Wooden churches in Norway
20th-century Church of Norway church buildings
Churches completed in 1931
1931 establishments in Norway